Winneshiek Medical Center is a 25-bed not-for-profit hospital located in Decorah, Iowa. It is part of the Mayo Clinic Health System.  Winneshiek Medical Center is the second largest critical access hospital in Iowa.

History
In the early 1900s, the Reverend Paul Koren began collecting donations for a hospital in Decorah, Iowa. William Smith gave the first donation of $10,000, and several other donors provided Koren another $15,000. The Decorah Hospital opened in 1914.

In 1957, the Decorah Hospital was renamed Smith Memorial Hospital in honor of its first donor.

In 1971, a new hospital building was constructed, and the name was changed to Winneshiek County Memorial Hospital. The old building was donated to Winneshiek County, which serves as the home of the county's department of health.

In 2004, the board of trustees changed the hospital's name to Winneshiek Medical Center.

In 2005, the Mayo Clinic's Decorah clinic merged with Winneshiek Medical Center. As part of this merger, the Mayo Clinic provides physician services for the hospital.

Medical operations
Winneshiek Medical Center operates five clinics in Decorah, Postville, and Ossian in Iowa, and Mabel, Spring Grove in Minnesota.

Winneshiek Medical Center partners with the Mayo Clinic to provide physician services their hospital. The Mayo Clinic provides both primary and specialty care.

Recognition
In 2016, the National Rural Health Association named Winneshiek Medical a Top 20 Critical Access Hospital in the nation.

References

Mayo Clinic
Hospital buildings completed in 1971
Hospitals in Iowa
1914 establishments in Iowa
Hospitals established in 1914